Mordellistena similis is a species of beetle in the genus Mordellistena of the family Mordellidae. It was described by Shchegolvera-Barovskaya.

References

External links
Coleoptera. BugGuide.

similis